= Khairahat Kalan =

Village in Uttar Pradesh, India

Khairahat Kalan is a village in Prayagraj, Uttar Pradesh, India.
